Susquehanna broad projectile points are stone projectile points manufactured by Native Americans what is now the Northeastern United States, generally in the time interval of 1200–700 BC. They are probably atlatl dart points, but some are large enough to have been spear points. They derive their name from the specimens throughout the Susquehanna River Valley in the northeastern United States, particularly Pennsylvania and New York.

Description 

Susquehanna broad points sizes generally range from 1 1/2 inches in length to 4 inches with an average of about 1 1/4 inches in length. The blade is triangular, the base is narrower than the ears. They are usually about twice as long as they are wide. Many specimens found in Pennsylvania and New York are made from rhyolite coming from outcrops near Gettysburg, Pennsylvania

Age and cultural affiliations 

They have mostly been dated to around 1200-700 BC, which is a transitional time between the hunter-gatherer cultures to a more agricultural based culture.

Distribution 

These points are generally found in the area around the Susquehanna River Valley, in New York and Pennsylvania.

See also
Other projectile points

External links 

 Virginia Department of Historic Resources

References 

Projectile points
Indigenous weapons of the Americas
12th-century BC beginnings